Katrina Adams and Cheryl Jones were the defending champions but did not compete that year.

Bettina Fulco and Mercedes Paz won in the final 6–3, 6–4 against Carin Bakkum and Simone Schilder.

Seeds
Champion seeds are indicated in bold text while text in italics indicates the round in which those seeds were eliminated.

 Bettina Fulco /  Mercedes Paz (champions)
 Carin Bakkum /  Simone Schilder (final)
 Adriana Villagrán /  Emilse Raponi-Longo (first round)
 Gisele Miró /  Gabriela Mosca (semifinals)

Draw

References
 1988 Rainha Cup Doubles Draw

Women's Doubles
Doubles
1988 in Brazilian tennis